F.C. Indiana is an American men's soccer team based in Lafayette, Indiana, United States. Founded in 2000, the team compete in the Premier Arena Soccer League indoor soccer league. The Lions also play in the National Premier Soccer League (NPSL), a national outdoor league at the fourth tier of the American Soccer Pyramid.

The men's club are affiliated with the F.C. Indiana women's team.

History

The Lions formed a men's adult team in 2006 and entered play in the PASL 2006-07 Winter season. The team then played outdoors in the NPSL 2007 season.

The team went hiatus for the 2008–09 season and returned to play both leagues in 2009. After their second NPSL campaign the team played exclusively indoor soccer for five seasons. In early December 2014 the team announced it would return to the NPSL for the 2015 season.

2019 season
2019 NPSL Great Lakes Conference Standings

Year-by-year

Stadia
 Kuntz Stadium; Indianapolis, Indiana (2007)
 Goshen Soccer Park; Goshen, Indiana 2 games (2007)
 Scheumann Stadium; Lafayette, Indiana (2009–12)
 Legacy Sports Club; Lafayette, Indiana (2012–present)

References

External links
 FC Indiana at NPSL's website

2000 establishments in Indiana
F.C. Indiana
Soccer clubs in Indiana
National Premier Soccer League teams
Premier Arena Soccer League teams
Sports teams in Indianapolis
Association football clubs established in 2000